Qamar Khun (also Romanized as Qamār Khūn; also known as Qal‘eh Samar Khān, Qal‘eh Samūr Khān, and Qal‘eh-ye S̄amūr Khān) is a village in Zalian Rural District, Zalian District, Shazand County, Markazi Province, Iran. At the 2006 census, its population was 66, in 16 families.

References 

Populated places in Shazand County